Garnett Bankhead Jr. (June 27, 1928 – September 15, 1991) was a former player in Negro league baseball.

Bankhead played with the Memphis Red Sox and Homestead Grays. In 1953, the played for the Drummondville Royals of the Provincial League.

His brothers Sam, Fred, Dan and Joe all also played in the Negro leagues, with Dan also playing in Major League Baseball.

References

External links

1928 births
1991 deaths
Drummondville Royals players
Homestead Grays players
Memphis Red Sox players
Baseball pitchers
People from Walker County, Alabama
Baseball players from Alabama
20th-century African-American sportspeople